Paul P. E. Bookson (January 25, 1933 – September 22, 2005) was an American lawyer and politician from New York.

Life
He was born on January 25, 1933, in New York City, the son of Leo Bookson and Anna Bookson. He practiced law in New York City, and entered politics as a Democrat. He married Tova Heller, and they had three daughters.

Bookson was a member of the New York State Senate from 1965 to 1974, sitting in the 175th, 176th, 177th, 178th, 179th and 180th New York State Legislatures. He was Chairman of the Committee on Agriculture in 1965.

In November 1975, he was elected to the New York City Civil Court, and was re-elected in 1985.

He was a member of the congregation of the Eldridge Street Synagogue, He was instrumental in achieving the restoration of the synagogue.

On September 22, 2005, Bookson was hit by a motorcycle while crossing Adams Street in Brooklyn, and died from his injuries a few hours later in Bellevue Hospital Center in Manhattan.

Sources

1933 births
2005 deaths
Politicians from Manhattan
Democratic Party New York (state) state senators
Jewish American state legislators in New York (state)
New York (state) state court judges
Road incident deaths in New York City
20th-century American judges
20th-century American politicians
20th-century American Jews
21st-century American Jews